Inside GNSS (IG) is an international controlled circulation trade magazine and website owned by Gibbons Media and Research LLC.  It covers space-based positioning, navigation and timing (PNT) technology for engineers, designers, and policy-makers of global navigation satellite systems (GNSS).  In the United States, GNSS is identified mainly with the government-operated Navstar Global Positioning System (GPS).  InsideGNSS.com is the complimentary website of online news, events, digital newsletters, and webinars, and archived magazine articles.

History

Circulation
The English-language print publication has a circulation of 30,000 qualified subscribers, of which 7,000 are outside the United States.

Editions
The suite of publications includes:
Six print and six digital editions per year;
Online news, events, and archived magazine articles;
Twice-monthly digital newsletters and web seminars on technical topics.

Content
The Inside GNSS editorial content has been heavily weighted towards issues of the four major GNSS operators: the United States (GPS), Russia (GLONASS), China (BeiDou), and the European Union (Galileo).  Regional and augmentation systems, such as those developed by the United States: (WAAS, SBAS); Japan: (QZSS); and Europe: (EGNOS); as well as eLoran, the terrestrial radio-navigation system, are also covered.

As GNSS systems have developed and evolved, the magazine has covered the integration of GNSS with other PNT technologies to improve user equipment in places where satellite signals are hard to obtain, the implications for manufacturers and policy-makers as more satellite signals and new systems become available, and the political and legal problems, and opportunities that arise as location-based technology becomes increasingly accurate.

Inside GNSS was the first publication to cover several GNSS political decisions and controversies, and the first outside of scholarly publications to cover several GNSS technical milestones.  The magazine presented the first stories about:
the decision for the common GPS / Galileo civilian signal,
the transformation of the European Galileo system from a public-private partnership to a European Commission-controlled programme;
the first analysis of the new Beidou signal,
the patent dispute between the U.S. and the E.U. over the L1 signal development,
the formation of the International Committee on GNSS of the United Nations Office for Outer Space Affairs,
revitalization of the GLONASS system,
and the first Galileo-only signal analysis.

List of major articles by subject

Staff
The editor and publisher is Glen Gibbons, an Oregon journalist who has covered GNSS continuously since 1989, six years before the first U.S. satellite constellation was fully operational in 1995.  In 2003, he received the U.S. Institute of Navigation's Norman P. Hays award for inspiration and support contributing to the advancement of navigation.  He was the founding editor of GPS World, Galileo's World, and GPS World Newsletter.

The magazine's Washington correspondent, Dee Ann Divis, received the Robert D.G. Lewis Watchdog Award from the Society of Professional Journalists Washington D.C. Pro Chapter (SPJDC) in 2012 for the extensive coverage of the LightSquared communications network, and the controversy over its interference with GPS signals during 2011 and 2012.  Divis also won the SPJDC's Dateline Award for Washington Correspondent in both 2012 and 2013.  In 2009, Richard Fischer, a former Advanstar Communications vice-president and general manager joined Inside GNSS as Director of Business Development.  Gwen Rhoads has served as the magazine's art director since 2006, and Peggie Kegel has been the magazine's circulation director since its founding.

In addition to Gibbons and Divis, the contributing editors are:
Günter Hein, head of Galileo and EGNOS Operations and Evolution for the European Space Agency, and a member of the European Commission's signal task force.
Mark Petovello, a professor of geomatics engineering at the University of Calgary (Alberta, Canada), and a member of the Position Location and Navigation research group.
European correspondent Peter Gutierrez, a senior reporter and editor based in Brussels, Belgium, who covers Europe's GNSS programmes.

The magazine has an international Editorial Advisory Council that includes several pioneer developers of GPS technology, including co-inventor of the Global Positioning System Bradford Parkinson, A.J. van Dierendonck, Tom Stansell, Phil Ward, and GPS policy developer Jules McNeff.

References

External links
Official Website
Company Member Directory

2006 establishments in Oregon
Bimonthly magazines published in the United States
Geographic data and information companies
Magazines established in 2006
Magazines published in Oregon
Professional and trade magazines
Satellite navigation
Science and technology magazines published in the United States